Murray Cromwell Morgan (1916–2000) was an author and historian of the Puget Sound region. Throughout his life he was also a writer, journalist, and political activist. He was a history teacher at Tacoma Community College.

Early life
Murray Morgan was born February 16, 1916, in Tacoma, Pierce County, Washington. His parents were Henry Victor Morgan and Adda Camille Layne Pearne Morgan. His father was a Unitarian Universalist minister and his mother wrote plays for the theater. Henry published his wife's plays and his poetry.

Education
He graduated from Stadium High School in Tacoma in 1933. He attended the University of Washington and was editor for its paper, UW Daily. Morgan wrote an article about the prevalence of venereal disease among the university's students, which resulted in him being suspended. He graduated from UW in 1937. Morgan attended Columbia University in New York, where he received a master's degree in communication.

Career

Journalist
Morgan was a journalist for the regional Hoquiam Daily Washingtonian and national news outlets, including Time and the New York Herald Tribune. He was also a radio personality for the Columbia Broadcasting System (CBS).

Historian
He was a noted historian of the Pacific Northwest, particularly Puget Sound. Some of his most noteworthy works are Skid Road, the "longest-running Pacific Northwest book in print" which was written about Seattle in 1946 and Puget's Sound written about Tacoma. Among other topics, he wrote about the Alaska Gold Rush, the Columbia River, the Aleutian Islands.

Morgan taught history at Tacoma Community College.

Personal life
In 1939, Morgan married Emma Rose Northcutt at the Unitarian Universalist church where his father was minister. He and his bride, nicknamed Rosa, spent their honeymoon in paddling a kayak on the Danube River. At the onset of World War II, "found themselves briefly immersed" in the wartime activities. The couple lived in a log cabin in Auburn; their home was previously Trout Lake Dance Hall. They had a daughter, Lane Morgan.

Morgan was diagnosed with stomach cancer in 1964. He was told that he had less than a year to live, but was able to overcome cancer. His treatment included surgery and a prescribed diet of hamburgers for breakfast.

He died on June 22, 2000, in Tacoma, Washington, and his remains were cremated.

Legacy
The Murray Morgan Bridge in Tacoma, originally known as the 11th Street Bridge, was renamed in 1997, to honor Morgan for his contributions as a Pacific Northwest historian of his generation. Morgan was a bridge tender on the bridge during the 1940s.

Published works
Murray Morgan
 
 
 
 
 
 
 
 
 
 
 
 
 
 
 
 
 
 The Viewless Winds. Oregon State University Press, Northwest Reprints series. 1990.  . 

Co-author

References

Further reading

External links
 Murray's people, a collection of Murray Morgan's stories
 Tacoma Community College Archive, Biographical Files

1916 births
20th-century American non-fiction writers
2000 deaths
University of Washington alumni
Columbia University alumni
20th-century American historians
20th-century American male writers
Writers from Tacoma, Washington
The Daily of the University of Washington alumni
Historians from Washington (state)
American male non-fiction writers